Universul Ciuciuleni was a Moldovan football club based in Ciuciuleni, Moldova. It has played in the Moldovan National Division, the top division in Moldovan football.

External links
 Universul Ciuciuleni at WeltFussballArchive 

Football clubs in Moldova
Defunct football clubs in Moldova
Association football clubs established in 1992
Association football clubs disestablished in 1994
1992 establishments in Moldova
1994 disestablishments in Moldova